Panagiotis Koutsoupakis (born 24 June 1950) is a Greek wrestler. He competed in the men's freestyle 62 kg at the 1972 Summer Olympics.

References

1950 births
Living people
Greek male sport wrestlers
Olympic wrestlers of Greece
Wrestlers at the 1972 Summer Olympics
Place of birth missing (living people)